The 1999 Bristol City Council election took place on 6 May 1999, on the same day as other local elections. All seats were up for election due to boundary changes, with each ward electing 2 councillors. The total number of seats on the council increased by 2 due to the creation of a new ward: Clifton East.

Despite losing seats to both the Liberal Democrats and the Conservatives, the Labour Party maintained control of the council with a slim overall majority.

Ward results

Ashley

Avonmouth

Bedminster

Bishopston

Bishopsworth

Brislington East

Brislington West

Cabot

Clifton

Clifton East

Cotham

Easton

Eastville

Filwood

Frome Vale

Hartcliffe

Henbury

Hengrove

Henleaze

Hillfields

Horfield

Kingsweston

Knowle

Lawrence Hill

Lockleaze

Redland

Southmead

Southville

St George East

St George West

Stockwood

Stoke Bishop

Westbury-on-Trym

Whitchurch Park

Windmill Hill

References

1999 English local elections
1999
1990s in Bristol